The London, Brighton and South Coast Railway E4 class is a class of 0-6-2T side tank steam locomotive designed by Robert Billinton. They were introduced in 1897 and were essentially a larger version of the E3 Class.

History
The E4 class of "radial tanks" were powerful for their size and were stalwarts of local passenger, freight and branch work for more than fifty years. They were very similar to the E3 tank engines from 1891, but the key differences were that their driving wheels were enlarged from 4 foot 6 inches to 5 foot and their boiler pressure was increased to 160 lb. Several were named after towns, villages and geographical features  in the LB&SCR area, for example No. 469 Beachy Head. Some of their names would be re-used for H2 Atlantics a few years later. They were so successful that they were more commonly assigned to passenger trains as opposed to freight work, which is what they were originally intended for. During World War I the Railway Operating Division borrowed several members of the class include Nos. 470, 481, 498, 504, 506, 518, 519, 562, 563, 564, 565, 577 and 580 for work in France. They first worked at an ammunition dump in Audruicq, France in November 1917 and were later sent to the Arras area in February 1918. All of them were returned to England in 1919. After Grouping they were primarily to be found around the Central section of the Southern Railway, with some going away from their traditional routes to places like Waterloo, Eastleigh and Tonbridge.

Seventy-five members of the class were built by Brighton Works between December 1897 and September 1903. All of the class survived to enter Southern Railway ownership in 1923. One example, No. 2483 Hellingly, was severely damaged as a result of enemy action against Eastbourne motive power depot in 1942 during a Luftwaffe air raid event known as the Baedeker Blitz. Hellingly was scrapped in July 1944. One engine, No. 2510, was tested on the railways of the Isle of Wright in 1947, albeit unsuccessfully. The class continued in regular use following the nationalisation of the Southern Railway as part of British Railways in 1948. However, with the arrival of diesel multiple units and the reduction in the number of branch lines after The Reshaping of British Railways in 1963, the locomotives gradually became surplus to requirements, and withdrawals commenced in 1955. Most of the class were withdrawn between 1958 and 1964.

Accidents and incidents
Locomotive No. 32468 ran into the buffers at  station, Brighton, East Sussex - January 12, 1963.

Operations

The E4 class were initially used on local passenger and freight services, and on branch lines.

Later in British Railways days, several examples were found new jobs as station pilots, most famously at London Waterloo, where they brought empty carriage rakes into the station from the yards at Clapham Junction. They were also used on services such as the locally famous Lancing Belle, which ran from Brighton to the Lancing Carriage Works of the London, Brighton and South Coast Railway, often double-headed with members of the same class or the larger E6 class.

Numbering
British Railways (BR) numbers were 32463-32520, 32556-32566 and 32577-32582.

E4X class
In 1909, four locomotives were rebuilt by D. E. Marsh with larger boilers and designated E4X.  These became BR numbers 32466, 32477, 32478 and 32489.

Preservation

One of the last survivors in 1963 was No. 32473. This was purchased by a group of preservationists and brought to the Bluebell Railway in East Sussex, where it has remained ever since, except for visits to other lines such as the Severn Valley Railway and Isle of Wight Steam Railway. The engine was withdrawn from traffic in 1971 and dismantled. However, work did not start in earnest until the 1980s and following a long overhaul, she returned to traffic in 1997 to celebrate her centenary in 1998. 

After a short period running in the genuine LB&SCR livery it carried after 1912, with the company's initials painted on the side tanks, these were re-lettered with its earlier LB&SCR name of Birch Grove. In 2005, she was repainted into British Railways lined black mixed traffic livery. Following withdrawal from service in May 2008, the locomotive was soon brought into the Bluebell workshops for a fast track overhaul, including a repaint into 1920s Southern Railway green to match much of the line's coaching stock. This was completed during January 2010, with the engine relaunched into traffic on 30 January 2010. 32473 is the only preserved LB&SCR locomotive not to be designed by William Stroudley.

Models

Bachmann Branchline produced several ready to run OO gauge models of the E4 tank including examples in SR olive green, BR black and LBSCR Marsh umber livery.

References

Sources
 Ian Allan ABC of British Railways Locomotives, 1949, part 2, page 35
 Bradley, D.L. (1974) Locomotives of the London Brighton and South Coast Railway, Part 3. Railway Correspondence and Travel Society.

External links 

 E4 Class (SEMG gallery)
 Class E-4 Details at Rail UK
 Class E4X Details at Rail UK
 LBSCR E4 0-6-2T names at LBSCR.ORG
 Bluebell Railway page on Birch Grove
 Bluebell Railway "Villa Team" page covering 1983-1998 overhaul

0-6-2T locomotives
E4
Railway locomotives introduced in 1897
Railway Operating Division locomotives
Standard gauge steam locomotives of Great Britain